Lewis and Harris, or Lewis with Harris, is a single Scottish island in the Outer Hebrides, divided by mountains. The northern two-thirds is called  Lewis and the southern third  Harris; each is frequently referred to as if it were a separate island.

Etymology
The island does not have a one-word name in either English or Scottish Gaelic, and is referred to as "Lewis and Harris", "Lewis with Harris", "Harris with Lewis" etc. Rarely used is the collective name of "the Long Island", although that epithet is sometimes applied to the entire archipelago of the Outer Hebrides, including the Uist group of islands and Barra.

Geography

Lewis–Harris boundary

Until 1975, Lewis belonged to the county of Ross and Cromarty and Harris to Inverness-shire. In practical terms, the dividing line is more clear-cut, according to National Geographic. "In a sense, the boundary line runs from Loch Resort in the west to Loch Seaforth in the east. The road between the two dips down past the shoulder of Clisham ... until the A859 hits the coast".

The boundary was originally between the lands of Clan MacLeod of Harris and Clan MacLeod of Lewis, the latter selling to Colin Mackenzie, 1st Earl of Seaforth. As thus determined, it runs southeast from Loch Resort up Clàr Beag to Loch Chleistir, then east along Bealach na h-Uamha to the River Langdale, then northeast through the peaks of Tom Ruisg, Mullach a' Ruisg, and Mullach Bhìogadail, east to Amhuinn a Mhuil, and downstream to where it enters Loch Seaforth at Ath Linne under the A859, the only road connecting Lewis and Harris. Seaforth Island was considered part of both Harris and Lewis; for statistical purposes half its area was assigned to each.

Harris

Most of Harris is very hilly, with more than thirty peaks above ; the highest peak, Clisham, is a Corbett.

Lewis

Lewis is comparatively flat, save in the south-east, where Ben More reaches , and in the south-west, where   is the highest point.

Nearby smaller islands
The Western Isles (or Outer Hebrides) also include the islands of North Uist, Benbecula and South Uist (they are three distinct islands but connected by a causeway) and Barra, just to the south of South Uist.

Population
Lewis and Harris is the most populous of the Scottish islands: It had just over 21,000 residents in 2011, a rise of 5.6% from the 2001 census total of 19,918. Stornoway is the main town of the island, and the civil parish of Stornoway, including the town and various nearby villages, has a population of about 12,000.

Transport links
Stornoway has ferry links to Ullapool and air services to Benbecula, Inverness, Aberdeen, Glasgow and Edinburgh.  (Tarbert) is the ferry terminal in Harris with connections to Skye and North Uist. However the main ferry to North Uist uses the terminal at Leverburgh (An t-Òb).

History
The lands around Stornoway were probably settled since 6000 BC and there are many monuments which show prehistoric man's presence. A Neolithic burial cairn and some evidence of Bronze Age occupation were found here. The Callanish Stones in the Loch Ròg area were erected roughly 5,000 years ago, thus dating from the late Neolithic or the early Bronze Age.

In the 9th century, Norsemen dominated the Isle; they eventually converted to Christianity. In the early 13th Century, the Nicholson family, or  MacNicols, built Castle Lewis at Stornoway harbour. In 1607, Stornoway became a burgh of barony. In 1844, Sir James Matheson purchased the Island and built Lews Castle between 1847 and 1857. By 1863, the town had become a police burgh; the last remains of the Old Castle were removed.

The island is the ancestral homeland of the Highland Clan MacLeod, with those individuals on Harris being referred to as from the Clan MacLeod of Harris or MacLeod of MacLeod, and those on Lewis being referred to as from the Clan MacLeod of Lewis.

Lewis is also the ancestral home of Clan Morrison.

The Lewis chessmen is a famous collection of 12th-century chess pieces, carved from walrus ivory and mostly in the form of human figures, which were discovered in Uig in 1831.

Economy

According to the Scottish government, "tourism is by far and away the mainstay industry" of the Outer Hebrides, "generating £65m in economic value for the islands, sustaining around 1000 jobs" The report adds that the "islands receive 219,000 visitors per year". Tourism accounted for 10–15% of economic activity on the Outer Hebrides islands in 2017, according to the tourism bureau. The agency states that the "exact split between islands is not possible" when calculating the number of visits, but "the approximate split is Lewis (45%), Uist (25%), Harris (20%), Barra (10%)".

Some visitors to Lewis and Harris are attracted by the beaches, particularly the spectacular Luskentyre, but also Seilebost, Horgabost, Scarasta and Borve. Others come for the dramatic landscapes of Harris, to experience the Gaelic traditions or the sense of history, for example at Dun Carloway or the 5,000 year old Callanish Stones.

A major industry on the island is the production of Harris tweed fabric (Clò Mór or Clò Hearach in Gaelic) which is made by hand on the island. It is the only commercially produced handwoven tweed in the world. To qualify as Harris tweed, the textile must be "handwoven by the islanders at their homes in the Outer Hebrides, finished in the Outer Hebrides, and made from pure virgin wool dyed and spun in the Outer Hebrides", according to a British Act of Parliament. Approximately 400 islanders were working in this industry as of late 2017. The textile is popular with celebrities and Royals.

There is only one manufacturer of Scotch whisky and gin in Isle of Harris, namely the Isle of Harris Distillery, which opened in 2019 and was working to produce The Hearach single malt. The Isle of Lewis also has one, Abhainn Dearg distillery, which was built in 2008.

Modern commercial activities centre on tourism, crofting, fishing, and weaving (including the manufacture of Harris tweed). Crofting (usually defined as small-scale food production) remains popular, with over 920 active crofters, according to a 2020 report: "with crofts ranging in size from as small as a single hectare to having access to thousands of hectares through the medium of community grazing". Crofters can apply for subsidy grants; some of these are intended to help them find other avenues to supplement their incomes.

A 2018 report stated that the fishing industry on the island primarily focused on aquaculture – fish farming. A conventional fishery still existed, "composed solely of inshore shellfish vessels targeting prawns, crabs and lobsters around the islands and throughout the Minch". 

The Isle of Lewis website states that Stornoway's "economy is a mix of traditional businesses like fishing, Harris Tweed and farming, with more recent influences like Tourism, the oil industry and commerce". The sheltered harbour has been important for centuries; it was named Steering Bay by Vikings, who often visited it. A December 2020 report stated that a new deep water terminal was to be developed, the Stornoway Deep Water Terminal, using a £49 million investment. The plan included berths for cruise ships as long as 360 metres, berths for large cargo vessels, and a freight ferry berth.

The UK's largest community-owned wind farm, the 9 MW Beinn Ghrideag, a "3-turbine, 9 MW scheme", is located outside Stornoway and is operated by Point and Sandwick Trust (PST).

In literature 
The Lewis Trilogy of novels (The Blackhouse, The Lewis Man and The Chessmen) by Peter May is set on Lewis and Harris.

See also 

 List of islands of Scotland

Footnotes

References 
 Johnstone, Scott; Brown, Hamish; and Bennet, Donald (1990) The Corbetts and Other Scottish Hills. Edinburgh. Scottish Mountaineering Trust.

External links 

 Google map
 hebrides.ca/ Home of the Quebec–Hebridean Scots who were cleared from Lewis to Quebec, 1838–1920s

 
Islands of the Outer Hebrides